is a Buddhist temple of the Kōyasan Shingon-shū sect in the Hike neighborhood of the city of Izunokuni, Shizuoka Prefecture, Japan. Its main image is a statue of Amida Nyōrai. The temple grounds were designated a National Historic Site on February 14, 1973. The temple is noted for a set of statues by the famed Kamakura period sculptor Unkei which are collectively designated a National Treasure of Japan.

History
Ganjōju-in is located at the eastern foot of Mount Moriyama at an elevation of 100 meters along the Kano River in the Izu Peninsula. Per the Azuma Kagami, Ganjōju-in was founded in 1189 by Hōjō Tokimasa to pray for the victory of the Minamoto forces in their campaign against the Northern Fujiwara at Hiraizumi. However, the temple's famed statues by Unkei  are all dated 1186, or three years before the campaign, indicating that the temple was actually intended as a bodaiji for the Hōjō clan. The temple continued to expand during the tenures of Hōjō Yoshitoki and Hōjō Yasutoki, becoming the largest and most important temple in Izu Province during the Kamakura period. However, the temple's prosperity was short-lived. During the wars of Hōjō Soun in the late Muromachi period, the temple was burned down in 1491 and although reconstructed, was burned down again by the forces of Toyotomi Hideyoshi during the 1590 Siege of Odawara. Under the Tokugawa shogunate, the temple was rebuilt in by Hōjō Ujisada (1703-1758) daimyō of Sayama Domain and the present Hondō dates from 1789, although all buildings of the temple were extensively rebuilt in 1967.

Then layout of the current temple is consistent with its description in the Azuma Kagami and per archaeological excavations conducted in 1970, the foundations of a number of structures mentioned in the Azuma Kagami but no longer existent today were located. Excavated old roof tiles and pottery shards are on  display at the Nagiyama Folk Museum. The temple is about a 15-minute walk from Nirayama Station on the Izuhakone Railway Sunzu Line.

Cultural properties

National Treasures

Ganjōju-in statues by Unkei
Ganjōju-in houses some of the few remaining works which can be definitely attributed to the Kamakura period sculptor Unkei: wooden images of Amida Nyorai, Bishamonten, Fudō Myōō and two attendants. Based on inscriptions found inside the sculptures, this group has been dated to 1186. Since June 19, 2013 these statues have been collectively designated a National Treasure of Japan.

Gallery

See also
List of Historic Sites of Japan (Shizuoka)
List of National Treasures of Japan (sculptures)

References

External links

 

Buddhist temples in Shizuoka Prefecture
Historic sites in Japan
Kōyasan Shingon temples
Izunokuni
Izu Province
National Treasures of Japan
1180s establishments in Japan